Sekgoma Memorial Hospital is a government-run district hospital located in Serowe, a town in Botswana's Central District. A trade and commercial centre, it is Botswana's largest village rich with the history of Botswana.

History 
The hospital was established in 1938. It is situated along the Palapye-Serowe road.

The hospital was totally rebuilt by Murray and Roberts (now known as Concor) in 2005.

References

External links 
 Botswana Ministry of Health

Hospital buildings completed in 1938
Hospitals in Botswana
Hospitals established in 1938